The Northern Sun Intercollegiate Conference (NSIC) is a college athletic conference affiliated with the National Collegiate Athletic Association (NCAA) at the Division II level, which operates in the western Midwestern United States. Nine of its members are in Minnesota, with three members in South Dakota, two members in North Dakota, and one member each in the states of Iowa and Nebraska. It was founded in 1932. With the recent NSIC expansion, the original six member schools have been reunited. With the inclusion of the several new member institutions, it is one of the largest Division II conferences in the country with 16 members.

The conference sponsors 18 sports; ten for women and eight for men. Both men and women compete in basketball, cross country, golf, and indoor and outdoor track and field. Men compete in baseball, football, and wrestling. Women compete in soccer, softball, swimming & diving, tennis, and volleyball. The NSIC is the only Division II conference that sponsors soccer for women but not men (two other D-II conferences do not sponsor soccer for either sex).

History

The Northern Sun Intercollegiate Conference was founded in 1932 as the Northern Teachers Athletic Conference. Charter members included Bemidji State Teachers College (Bemidji State University), Duluth State Teachers College (University of Minnesota Duluth), Mankato State Teachers College (Minnesota State University, Mankato), Moorhead State Teachers College (Minnesota State University Moorhead), St. Cloud State Teachers College (St. Cloud State University), and Winona State Teachers College (Winona State University). In 1942 the conference name was changed to the State Teacher's College Conference of Minnesota. The conference switched its name to the Northern Intercollegiate Conference (NIC) in 1962. In the spring of 1992 the NSIC was formed out of the merger of the NIC, the men's conference, and the women's Northern Sun Conference (NSC). In 1992, the NSIC joined NCAA Division II after being long time
members of the National Association of Intercollegiate Athletics (NAIA).

In the 1998–99 academic year, the NSIC became an expanded eight-team league from a previous seven-member conference by adding Wayne State College, and in 1999–2000 became a 10-member conference by adding Concordia University, St. Paul, and the University of Minnesota Crookston. The conference existed as an eight-member league from 2004–05 until 2005–06 with the departure of Minnesota–Duluth to the now defunct North Central Conference, and the University of Minnesota Morris to NCAA Division III. The University of Mary and Upper Iowa University were admitted in the fall of 2006 to again expand the NSIC to 10 members.

In 2007 the NSIC Board of Directors voted to expand the conference to 14 schools. League presidents voted to accept into membership Augustana College (now Augustana University), St. Cloud State, Minnesota–Duluth, and Minnesota State. These four schools were members of the North Central Conference which disbanded after the 2007–2008 academic year. They became official members of the NSIC on July 1, 2008.

On January 20, 2010, the NSIC Board of Directors voted to expand the conference again, this time to 16 members. The league accepted into membership the University of Sioux Falls and Minot State University. Both schools moved from the NAIA, with USF leaving the Great Plains Athletic Conference, and Minot State leaving the Dakota Athletic Conference. The two schools became active members in the 2012–13 academic year.

The NSIC and its member institutions have been members of the National Association of Intercollegiate Athletics (NAIA). Mankato State won the NAIA wrestling national titles in 1958 and 1959, while Moorhead State won a wrestling national title in 1964. Forty-one wrestlers have claimed individual national titles in wrestling. Nine individuals have won national titles in Men's Swimming and Diving. Northern State claimed national titles in women's basketball in 1992 and 1994. Seven individuals have won individual titles in men's indoor track and field. Four individuals have won national titles in women's indoor track and field. Eleven athletes have won national titles in men's outdoor track and field. Six female athletes have won individual titles in outdoor track and field. Winona State won two team titles in women's gymnastics. In 1992, the NSIC entered the National Collegiate Athletic Association (NCAA). In the Fall of 1995, the NSIC and its member institutions became eligible for championship competition in the NCAA Division II ranks. The Northern Sun earned its first Division II national championship in a team sport sponsored by the conference when Winona State won the men's basketball championship in 2005–06.

Since becoming affiliated with NCAA Division II, NSIC members have won 23 team national championships and has also crowned 77 individual national champions.

The highest-ranking team in the NSIC in football that does not make the playoffs plays in the Mineral Water Bowl in Excelsior Springs, Missouri.

Chronological timeline
Since 1932, 18 institutions have competed in the NSIC. Although all six charter members are in the conference today, only three of them have remained in the conference for the 80 years of its existence: Bemidji State, Minnesota State–Moorhead, and Winona State.

 1932: The Northern Teacher's Athletic Conference was founded with six charter members: Bemidji State Teachers College (now Bemidji State University), Duluth State Teachers College (now the University of Minnesota Duluth), Mankato State Teachers College (now Minnesota State University, Mankato), Moorhead State Teachers College (now Minnesota State University Moorhead), St. Cloud State Teachers College and Winona State Teachers College (now Winona State University).
 1942: The conference changed its name to the State Teacher's College Conference of Minnesota.
 1947: Duluth State Teachers College was renamed the University of Minnesota Duluth.
 1951: Minnesota–Duluth left for the Minnesota Intercollegiate Athletic Conference (MIAC). The conference was left with five teams.
 1957: The Michigan College of Mining and Technology (now Michigan Technological University) joined the STCCM to give the league six members. Bemidji State Teachers College was renamed Bemidji State College. Mankato State Teachers College was renamed Mankato State College. Moorhead State Teachers College becomes known as Moorhead State College. St. Cloud State Teachers College becomes St. Cloud State College and Winona State Teachers College becomes Winona State College.
 1962: The conference changed its name to the Northern Intercollegiate Conference (NIC).
 1964: The Michigan College of Mining and Technology renamed itself to Michigan Technological University.
 1966: The University of Minnesota Morris joined the NIC, membership stands at seven schools.
 1968: Mankato State left the NIC to join the North Central Conference (NCC), leaving the conference with six members.
 1969: Southwest Minnesota State College joined the NIC as the seventh member.
 1975: Minnesota–Duluth re-joined the NIC, giving the NIC eight teams. Bemidji State College was renamed Bemidji State University. Mankato State College was renamed Mankato State University and Moorhead State College was renamed Moorhead State University. Also, St. Cloud State College was renamed to St. Cloud State University and Winona State College was renamed to Winona State University. Southwest Minnesota State College also underwent a name change, becoming Southwest State University.
 1978: Mankato State re-joined the NIC and Northern State College (now Northern State University) joined the league as the ninth and tenth teams, respectively.
 1979: The Northern Sun Conference (NSC) was created for women's athletics.
 1980: Michigan Tech left for the Great Lakes Intercollegiate Athletic Conference (GLIAC), leaving the NIC with nine teams.
 1981: St. Cloud State and Mankato State left for the NCC. The NIC was left with seven members.
 1989: Northern State College was renamed to Northern State University.
 1992: The Northern Intercollegiate Conference (men's conference) and the Northern Sun Conference (women's conference) merged to form the Northern Sun Intercollegiate Conference (NSIC). The NSIC joins NCAA Division II.
 1995: The NSIC became eligible for NCAA Division II championship competition, having moved from the NAIA level.
 1998: Mankato State University was renamed Minnesota State University, Mankato.
 1998: Wayne State College joined as the NSIC's eighth member.
 1999: Concordia University, St. Paul and the University of Minnesota Crookston joined to give the NSIC 10 teams.
 2000: Moorhead State University was renamed Minnesota State University Moorhead.
 2003: Minnesota–Morris left the NSIC and drops down to the NCAA Division III level and the Upper Midwest Athletic Conference (UMAC), dropping NSIC membership to nine teams. Also, Southwest State University changed its name to Southwest Minnesota State University.
 2004: Minnesota–Duluth left the NSIC to join the NCC, leaving the NSIC with eight schools.
 2006: The University of Mary and Upper Iowa University joined the NSIC to bring membership back up to 10 schools.
 2008: The North Central Conference disbanded as various members in that league make a move to NCAA Division I. Former NSIC members Minnesota–Duluth, Minnesota State, and St. Cloud State re-joined the Northern Sun. Another NCC refugee, Augustana College (now Augustana University) joined the NSIC for the first time, increasing membership to 14 schools.
 2012: Minot State University and the University of Sioux Falls begin full membership after joining NCAA Division II from the NAIA. This gave the league its largest membership at 16 schools.
 2012: Lindenwood University and the University of Nebraska at Kearney, both members of the Mid-America Intercollegiate Athletics Association became associate members of the NSIC in the sport of women's swimming & diving. Following the end of the 2013–14 season, both schools left the NSIC to join the Rocky Mountain Athletic Conference (RMAC) for that sport.
 2019: Minnesota–Crookston and St. Cloud State discontinued their football programs at the end of the 2019–20 academic year.
 2021: The University of Wisconsin–Parkside, athletically branded as Parkside, joined as an affiliate member for wrestling.
 2022: Upper Iowa announces it will depart for the Great Lakes Valley Conference for the 2023-24 athletic season and beyond.

Member schools

Current members
The NSIC currently has 16 full members, all but five are public schools:

Notes

 Upper Iowa will depart the NSIC following the conclusion of the 2022-23 athletics season for the GLVC.

Affiliate members
The NSIC currently has one affiliate member, which is also a public school:

Former members
The NSIC had two former full members, both were public schools:

Notes

Former affiliate members
The NSIC had two former affiliate members, one was a public school and the other was a private school:

Notes

Membership timeline

Sports

Men's sponsored sports by school

Women's sponsored sports by school

Other sponsored sports by school

Notes

In addition to the above teams:
 Upper Iowa classifies its cheerleaders and dance team members as varsity athletes under the "spirit" designation. It also fields coeducational teams in shotgun sports.
 At least three conference schools are now sponsoring esports: SMSU, Upper Iowa, and Concordia-St Paul.

Conference stadiums

National champions

NCAA Division II
The NSIC has had 25 national championship teams in NCAA Division II play:

NCAA Division II National Champions

NAIA
NAIA National Champions

Commissioners

The NSIC has had five full-time commissioners in its history.

Tom Wistrcill (1993–1997)
Kurt Patberg (1997–2000)
Mike Lockrem (2000–2003)
Butch Raymond (2004–2014)
Erin Lind (2014–present)

Conference championships

Last updated November 17, 2022

Includes Regular Season and Tournament Championships

Football
NSIC Championships Won or Shared Per School

NSIC All-Time Standings (1932–2022)

NSIC North Division All-Time Standings (2008-2022)

NSIC South Division All-Time Standings (2008-2022)

NSIC Champions

*Minnesota State finished 2012 with an 11-0 overall conference record and 7-0 division record, however the conference and division titles were stripped after Mankato was found to have played with two ineligible players. Minnesota–Duluth (overall) and Winona State (South Division) were granted the 2012 titles retroactively. Mankato's win–loss record, however, remains the same.

Volleyball

NSIC Championships Per School

The NSIC Tournament was only held from 2004 to 2007, then resumed in 2012.

NSIC All-Time Standings (1979 to 2019)

NSIC Regular Season Champions

NSIC Tournament Champions

Men's Basketball
NSIC championships won per school

NSIC All-Time Standings (1932–33 to 2021–22)

NSIC Regular Season Champions

(*)-Due to the COVID-19 pandemic, no regular season conference champion was awarded during the 2020-21 season, only the winner of the North and South division were awarded.

NSIC Tournament Champions

Women's Basketball
NSIC Championships Per School

NSIC All-Time Standings (1979-80 to 2020–21)

NSIC Regular Season Champions

(*)-Due to the COVID-19 pandemic, no regular season conference championship was awarded during the 2020-21 season, on the North and South division champions were awarded.

NSIC Tournament Champions

Baseball
NSIC Championships Per School

NSIC Regular Season Champions
The NSIC Tournament was used to determine the overall NSIC Champion from 2002 to 2006.

NSIC Tournament Champions

Softball

NSIC Championships Per School

NSIC All-Time Standings (1984 to 2019)

NSIC Regular Season Champions

NSIC Tournament Champions

Women's Soccer

NSIC Championships Per School

1997-2001 Tournament Champion declared NSIC Champion

NSIC All-Time Standings (1996 to 2022)

NSIC Champions By Year
The NSIC Tournament was used to determine the NSIC Champion from 1997 to 2001.

Women's Tennis
NSIC Championships Per School

Before 2007, Tournament Champion determined Team Titles

Men's Cross Country
NSIC Championships Per School

Women's Cross Country
NSIC Championships Per School

Wrestling
NSIC Championships Per School

*=No Longer Sponsors Wrestling

Men's Golf
NSIC Championships Per School

*=No Longer Sponsors Men's Golf

Women's Golf
NSIC Championships Per School

Men's Indoor Track and Field
NSIC Championships Per School

Women's Indoor Track and Field
NSIC Championships Per School

Men's Outdoor Track and Field
NSIC Championships Per School

Women's Outdoor Track and Field
NSIC Championships Per School

Swimming and Diving
NSIC Championships Per School

See also
2010 NSIC men's basketball tournament

References

External links

 
College sports in Minnesota
College sports in South Dakota
College sports in North Dakota
College sports in Nebraska
College sports in Iowa